Aleksandrów  is a village in the administrative district of Gmina Żychlin, within Kutno County, Łódź Voivodeship, in central Poland.

See also
List of cities and towns in Poland

References

Villages in Kutno County